Hugh Westlake (c.1656 - after 1700) was a barrister of the Middle Temple and the Surveyor of the Woods for the Duchy of Lancaster.

Early life
Hugh Westlake was born around 1656.

Career
Westlake was a barrister of the Middle Temple and the Surveyor of the Woods for the Duchy of Lancaster. In 1698, or slightly after, he carried out a survey of the royal hunting ground of Enfield Chase in order to allow the felling of timber for the creation of new ridings and a lawn of 300 acres in the centre for deer to feed in. As a result of this survey a new map was created of the Chase, one of the few to exist, and one of the last before enclosure of the Chase in 1777.

References

External links 
 

1650s births
English barristers
English surveyors
Year of death uncertain
Duchy of Lancaster
Enfield Chase